Miguel Nasur Allel is a Chilean-Palestinian businessman and former footballer.

Biography
He owned the Santiago-based professional team Santiago Morning. He bought the club to become a major shareholder for an undisclosed amount in 2005 after Demetrio Marinakis left the club.

Nasur was President of Asociación Nacional de Fútbol Profesional in 1986. He has also engaged in other ventures such as Chilean land development. He is owner of Radio La Clave and Hotel Los Nogales in Santiago, Chile.

In 2016, Nasur bought the Miami United FC and became its president.

See also
Munib al-Masri

Notes

References

Palestinian football chairmen and investors
Palestinian capitalists
Chilean people of Palestinian descent
Palestinian emigrants to Chile
Living people
Chilean people of Syrian descent
Presidents of the ANFP
1935 births
Chilean footballers